Phenicothrips is a genus of thrips in the family Phlaeothripidae.

Species
 Phenicothrips callosae
 Phenicothrips daetymon
 Phenicothrips eugeniae
 Phenicothrips gracilis
 Phenicothrips inquilinus
 Phenicothrips lividipes
 Phenicothrips siamensis
 Phenicothrips spectator

References

Phlaeothripidae
Thrips
Thrips genera